KWSW (980 AM) is a radio station licensed to Eureka, California, United States. The station airs an adult contemporary format (with a few adult standards formatted songs being added) and serves the Eureka area. The station is currently owned by Eureka Broadcasting, Inc.

History
The station began broadcasting on January 26, 1947, and held the call sign KHUM. It originally broadcast at 1240 kHz. In 1956, KHUM's frequency was changed to 980 kHz.

Its call sign was changed to KINS in 1958. The station aired a middle of the road (MOR) format in the 1970s, and a news-talk format in the 1990s and 2000s. In 2011, the station's call sign was changed to KWSW. The station continued to air a news-talk format. On June 9, 2015, the station's call sign was changed to KEJY, but it was changed back to KWSW on August 13, 2015. It adopted a soft AC format branded "EZ Radio" on July 1, 2017.

References

External links
KWSW's official website

WSW
Mainstream adult contemporary radio stations in the United States
Mass media in Humboldt County, California
Radio stations established in 1947
1947 establishments in California